Avengement is a 2019 British action film directed by Jesse V. Johnson, starring Scott Adkins, Craig Fairbrass, and Thomas Turgoose. The film follows Cain Burgess, a prisoner who escapes police custody after his mother's death and visits a private bar, holding its members hostage as he starts revealing his past and what led to him becoming a violent fighter.

Avengement was released on 24 May 2019 on VOD and in selected theatres. It received generally positive reviews from critics, who highlighted the action sequences and Adkins' performance. In 2020, a special edition was released, containing an uncut version of the film.

Plot
Prisoner Cain Burgess is being escorted by police to a hospital where he learns of his mother's death. After seeing her corpse, he fights off the cops and escapes their custody. He then visits a private bar, entering it after attacking the bouncers. While having his drink, he overhears one of the patrons named Tune describe how an unknown assailant killed a fellow gangster named Rook. Cain intervenes with his laughter, only to invite the wrath of Tune, his fellow patrons and Bez, the bartender. Claiming himself to be a friend of Lincoln, the owner of the bar, he tells everyone he'd walk away after finishing his drink, but gets into a brawl, acquires a double-barreled shotgun and holds everyone hostage. Soon, Lincoln's lieutenant Hyde arrives, recognizes Cain as Lincoln's brother and is also held hostage. One of the patrons trying to intervene is shot in the kneecap by Cain, who blames Hyde and Lincoln for his condition. Cain then starts narrating that he got sent to the notorious London prison HMP Belmarsh and had to fight for survival in prison due to a £20,000 price put on his head.

It is revealed that Cain used to be a skilled but quick-tempered martial artist who caused Lincoln, a loan shark, and several gangsters to lose substantial amounts of money every time he wins. Seeking to invest in a legitimate business, Cain comes to Lincoln for financial help, and is pulled into the world of crime when he is asked to rob a mark who has retrieved a package from one of Lincoln's gangsters, in exchange for money. Cain succeeds in stealing the package from a middle-aged woman who pursues him and gets killed in an accident during the chase. Cain is arrested and charged with manslaughter. Detective O'Hara explains that Lincoln's scam baits marks into acting as a bagman to forgive their debts. Lincoln arranges for someone to steal the bag, causing the mark to owe Lincoln even more money than before. When Cain refuses to cooperate with the police, a corrupt cop, Sgt. Evans, beats him up. Despite his clean record, Cain is sentenced to England's most violent prison where he gets into several fights and sustains severe injuries to his teeth and face. Despite fighting in self-defense, his sentence is repeatedly extended and this prompts him to become a cold-blooded killer in order to survive. After several years, one of his attackers reveals Lincoln has put a large bounty on his head. O'Hara, who has since learned about the bounty, once again asks Cain to give up his brother. Cain agrees on the condition that he be allowed to visit his dying mother at a hospital. They are too late, and Cain misses his chance but escapes custody after violently beating the police officers who delayed his visit.

By night, Lincoln arrives and is similarly threatened by Cain. Lincoln appeals to Cain's better nature, not realizing the changes he has been forced to undergo. Hyde mocks Cain and insults the people they conned. Enraged at his flippant attitude at destroying so many lives, including his own, Cain shoots and kills Hyde in front of the others. Realizing that Cain has changed, Lincoln drops his pretenses and admits to ordering a hit. Cain angrily says that he never spoke to the police and that Sgt. Evans admitted to spreading the false rumor before Cain killed him. Although surprised at the viciousness of Cain's vengeance, Lincoln says he never even cared whether it was true; the real reason he ordered the hit on Cain was because he lost respect either way from just the rumor, which Lincoln couldn't abide. After proving that he has emptied Lincoln's bank account, Cain announces that he will now kill Lincoln, and offers to let everyone else leave. Tune leaves, but returns with a submachine gun planning to ambush Cain before being quickly subdued by him. The rest are killed in the ensuing fight. Lincoln vows to recover, and, with all the guns emptied, attacks Cain with a knife. Cain eventually overpowers and stabs his brother, killing Lincoln. He then morbidly leaves Bez behind, and stumbles out of the bar before collapsing on a nearby bench. In his office, Detective O'Hara discovers that Lincoln's bank account has been divided amongst his victims by Cain.

Cast 

 Scott Adkins as Cain Burgess
 Craig Fairbrass as Lincoln Burgess
 Thomas Turgoose as Tune
 Nick Moran as Hyde
 Kierston Wareing as Bez
 Mark Strange as Clif
 Leo Gregory as Mo
 Luke Lafontaine as Chas
 Beau Fowler as Vern
 Dan Styles as Newbold
 Christopher Sciueref as Yeates
 Matt Routledge as Orderly
 Jane Thorne as Mrs. Burgess
 Louis Mandylor as Detective O'Hara
 Terence Maynard as Stokes
 Daniel Adegboyega as Rook

Production
Avengement is the sixth collaboration between director Jesse V. Johnson and Scott Adkins. 
Johnson's script was inspired by a 1962 samurai film called Harakiri by director Masaki Kobayashi. Adkins had been looking for a film project based in the United Kingdom and Johnson selected Avengement, one of his older scripts. Stu Small was brought in to rewrite the dialogue and tailor it to Adkins. Stu extensively rewrote the script, and updated older parts of the script. Shortly before filming began Johnson watched a documentary on crime in the UK and used it to add true crime elements to the story.

Reception
The website's critics consensus reads: "Avengement compensates for a lack of narrative originality with thrilling sequences of violent, bone-crunching action, elevated by Scott Adkins' brutally intense performance." On Metacritic the film has a score of 63% based on reviews from 5 critics.

Chris Nashawaty of Entertainment Weekly wrote: "Director Jesse V. Johnson sprinkles in enough cruel twists of fate and melancholy-laced flashbacks to prevent Avengement from becoming just another disposable exercise in action sadism on a budget. The real credit, though, goes to Adkins, who one of these days will hopefully get called up to the Hollywood big leagues and wind up surprising a lot of people — and grin while he’s doing it."

Noel Murray of the Los Angeles Times wrote: "Avengement features a good balance of colorfully profane British gangster-speak and intense, explicitly gory punch-outs." Frank Scheck of The Hollywood Reporter wrote: "Portraying his most complex character to date, Adkins delivers a ferocious turn that proves visceral in its emotional as well as physical intensity."

References

External links
 

2019 films
2019 action films
British action films
British films about revenge
Films about criminals
Films about brothers
Films set in England
British prison films
2010s prison films
2010s English-language films
Films directed by Jesse V. Johnson
2010s British films